Panaphidini is a tribe of aphids in the subfamily Calaphidinae.

Genera

Subtribe: Myzocallidina
Andorracallis -
Apulicallis -
Hoplocallis -
Hoplochaetaphis -
Hoplochaitophorus -
Lachnochaitophorus -
Mexicallis -
Myzocallis -
Neosymydobius -
Patchia -
Serratocallis -
Siculaphis -
Tuberculatus -
Wanyucallis

Subtribe: Panaphidina
Appendiseta -
Bicaudella -
Chromaphis -
Chromocallis -
Chuansicallis -
Chucallis -
Cranaphis -
Ctenocallis -
Dasyaphis -
Eucallipterus -
Indiochaitophorus  -
Melanocallis -
Mesocallis -
Monellia -
Monelliopsis -
Neochromaphis -
Neocranaphis -
Panaphis -
Phyllaphoides -
Protopterocallis -
Pseudochromaphis -
Pterocallis -
Quednaucallis -
Sarucallis -
Shivaphis -
Sinochaitophorus -
Subtakecallis -
Takecallis -
Therioaphis -
Tiliaphis -
Tinocallis -
Tinocalloides

References

External links 

 
Calaphidinae
Hemiptera tribes